Denard Antuan Walker (born August 9, 1973) is a former American football cornerback who played in the National Football League (NFL). Walker was drafted by the Tennessee Oilers in the 1997 NFL Draft out of Louisiana State University.

Professional career

On October 26, 1997, Walker recorded his first career pick-six, which came from off of Arizona Cardinals quarterback Jake Plummer.

On January 30, 2000, the Titans made it to Super Bowl XXXIV in which Walker started. The team lost to the St. Louis Rams.

On October 28, 2001, as a member of the Denver Broncos, Walker recorded his second career pick-six, which came off of quarterback Tom Brady. The interception recorded late in the fourth quarter and helped the Broncos defeat the New England Patriots.

References

1973 births
Living people
American football cornerbacks
Tennessee Oilers players
Tennessee Titans players
Denver Broncos players
Minnesota Vikings players
Oakland Raiders players
LSU Tigers football players